William Cunliffe Lister (13 December 1809 – 12 August 1841) was a British Whig politician, and barrister.

Born in Addingham, Yorkshire, Lister was the son of Ellis Cunliffe Lister—who, between 1832 and 1841, was a Whig Member of Parliament (MP) for Bradford—and Mary née Kay.

First educated at Charterhouse School, in 1825 he was then admitted to Trinity College, Cambridge, graduating with a Bachelor of Arts in 1831, before being called to the bar at Lincoln's Inn in 1834.

He followed his father into politics, becoming a Whig MP for the same constituency when his father retired at the 1841 general election, but died, unmarried, just over a month later.

References

External links
 

UK MPs 1841–1847
Whig (British political party) MPs for English constituencies
1809 births
1841 deaths
Alumni of Trinity College, Cambridge
Members of Lincoln's Inn
People educated at Charterhouse School
Politicians from Bradford